The Col de la Croix Fry is a mountain pass located in the Chaîne des Aravis, between Manigod and La Clusaz in the Haute-Savoie department of France.  The road over the col is used occasionally by the Tour de France cycle race with the tour crossing the pass on Stage 19 of the 2013 Tour. At the summit is the village of La Croix Fry.

Details of the climb
Over this distance, the road climbs  at an average gradient of 6.6%. En route, the climb passes through the village of Manigod.

The climb from the east starts at Saint-Jean-de-Sixt, passing through La Clusaz.

Tour de France
The Col de la Croix Fry was first used in the Tour de France cycle race in 1994 when the leader over the summit was Piotr Ugrumov. Since then, the pass has been crossed four more times, including on Stage 10 of the 2018 Tour.

Appearances in Tour de France

References

Mountain passes of Auvergne-Rhône-Alpes
Landforms of Haute-Savoie